Composers of the Baroque era, ordered by date of birth:

Transition from Renaissance to Baroque (born 1500–49)
Composers in the Renaissance/Baroque transitional era include the following (listed by their date of birth):
 Philippe de Monte (1521–1603)
 Baldassare Donato (1525/1530–1603)
 Costanzo Porta (1529–1601)
 Jiří Rychnovský (1529–1616)
 Guillaume Costeley (1530–1606)
 Fabritio Caroso (1530–1605/1620)
 Mateo Flecha the Younger (1530–1604)
 Gianmatteo Asola (1532–1609)
 Andrea Gabrieli (1532/1523–1585)
 Claudio Merulo (1533–1604)
 Francesco Soto de Langa (1534–1619)
 Rocco Rodio (1535–after 1615)
 Mikołaj Gomółka (1535–1609)
 Cesare Negri (1535–1605)
Simone de Bonefont (1535 -  ?)
 Johannes Matelart (before 1538–1607)
 Stefano Felis (1538–1603)
 William Byrd (1540–1623)
 Matthäus Waissel (1540–1602)
 Giovanni Ferretti (1540–after 1609)
 Tiburzio Massaino (1540–after 1608)
 Hernando de Cabezón (1541–1602)
 Gioseffo Guami (1542–1611)
 Giovanni Maria Nanino (1543/1544–1607)
 Francesco Guami (1544–1602)
 Anthony Holborne (1545–1602)
 Luzzasco Luzzaschi (1545–1607)
 Jakub Polak (1545–1605)
 Ginés de Boluda (1545–1606)
 Manuel Mendes (1547–1605)
 Francesco Soriano (1548–1621)
 Tomás Luis de Victoria (1548–1611)
 Eustache Du Caurroy (1549–1609)
 Bernardo Clavijo del Castillo (1549–1626)

Early Baroque era composers (born 1550–99)
Composers of the Early Baroque era include the following figures listed by the probable or proven date of their birth:
 Jacobus Gallus (1550–1591)
 Charles Tessier (1550–after 1604)
 Thomas Mancinus (1550–1612)
 Ippolito Baccusi (1550–1609)
 Emilio de' Cavalieri (c. 1550–1602)
 Cesario Gussago (1550–1612)
 Pomponio Nenna (1550–1613)
 Riccardo Rognoni (c. 1550–c. 1620)
 David Sacerdote (1550–1625)
 Ruggiero Trofeo (1550–1614)
 Orazio Vecchi (1550–1605)
 Guillaume de Chastillon, sieur de La Tour (c. 1550–1610)
 Tomasz Szadek (1550–1612)
 Krzysztof Klabon (1550–1616)
 Gregory (Gregorius) Howet (Huwet) (1550–1617)
 Pedro de Cristo (1550–1618)
 Vicente Espinel (1550–1624)
 Juan Navarro (1550–1610)
 Ambrosio Cotes (1550–1603)
 Sebastián Raval (1550–1604)
 Jan Trojan Turnovský (1550–1606)
 Pavel Spongopaeus Jistebnický (1550–1619)
 Giulio Caccini (1551–1618)
 Benedetto Pallavicino (1551–1601)
 Girolamo Belli (1552–1620)
 Edmund Hooper (1553–1621)
 Johannes Eccard (1553–1611)
 Leonhard Lechner (1553–1606)
 Elway Bevin (1554–1638)
 William Inglot (1554–1621)
 Emmanuel Adriaenssen (1554–1604)
 Cosimo Bottegari (1554–1620)
 Girolamo Diruta (1554-after 1610)
 Giovanni Giacomo Gastoldi (1554–1609)
 Giovanni Gabrieli (c. 1554/1557–1612)
 Jacques Champion, Sieur de la Chapelle (before 1555–1642)
 John Mundy (1555–1630)
 Gabriele Villani (1555–1625)
 Manuel Rodrigues Coelho (c. 1555–c. 1635)
 Paolo Quagliati (c. 1555–1628)
 Alonso Lobo (1555–1617)
 Johannes Nucius (c. 1556–1620)
 Thomas Morley (1557–1602)
 Carolus Luython (1557–1620)
 Jacques Mauduit (1557–1627)
 Giovanni Croce (c. 1557–1609)
 Alfonso Fontanelli (1557–1622)
 Wojciech Długoraj (1557–after 1619)
 Nathaniel Giles (1558–1634)
 Matthew Jeffries (1558–1615)
 Ferdinando Richardson (1558–1618)
 Richard Carlton (1558–1638)
 Philippus Schoendorff (1558–1617)
 Giovanni Bassano (c. 1558–1617)
 Scipione Stella (1558/1559–1622)
 Richard Allison (1560/1570–before 1610)
 Felice Anerio (1560–1614)
 Giulio Belli (c. 1560–1621 or later)
 William Brade (1560–1630)
Abraham Blondet (1560–1634)
 William Cobbold (1560–1639)
 Nicolas Gistou (1560-1609)
 James Harding (1560–1626)
 Diomedes Cato (c. 1560/1565–1618)
 Camillo Lambardi (c. 1560–1634) 
 Giovanni Bernardino Nanino (c. 1560–1623)
 Peter Philips (c. 1560–1628)
 Hieronymus Praetorius (1560–1629)
 August Nörmiger (1560–1613) 
 Thomas Robinson (1560–1610)
 Lodovico Grossi da Viadana (c. 1560–1627)
 Scipione Dentice (1560–1635)
 Carlo Gesualdo (1560–1613)
 Ruggiero Giovannelli (c. 1560–1625)
 Antonio II Verso (1560–1621)
 Leone Leoni (1560–1627)
 Petrus de Drusina (1560–1611)
 Juan Esquivel Barahona (1560–after 1625)
 Elias Mertel (1561–1626)
 Sebastian Aguilera de Heredia (1561–1627)
 Jacopo Peri (1561–1633)
 Francesco Usper, or Francesco Sponga (1561–1641)
 John Bull (1562–1628)
 Jan Pieterszoon Sweelinck (1562–1621)
 Andreas Raselius (1562–1602)
 Jean Titelouze (1562/1563–1633)
 John Dowland (1563–1626)
 Giles Farnaby (c. 1563–1640)
 John Milton (1563–1647)
 Cornelis Verdonck (1563–1625)
 John Danyel (1564–1626)
 Hans Leo Hassler (1564–1612)
 Kryštof Harant z Polžic a Bezdružic (1564–1621)
 Giulio Cesare Martinengo (1564/1568–1613)
 John Hilton (1565–1609?)
 Michael Cavendish (1565–1628)
 John Farmer (1565–1605)
 George Kirbye (1565–1634)
 William Leighton (1565–1622)
 Leonard Woodson (1565–1641)
 Gregor Aichinger (c. 1565–1628)
 Duarte Lobo (c. 1565–1646)
 Erasmo Marotta (1565–1641)
 Ascanio Mayone (c. 1565–1627)
 Giovanni Pietro Flaccomio (1565–1617)
 Simone Molinaro (1565–1615)
 Francis Pilkington (c. 1565–1638)
 Manuel Cardoso (1566–1650)
 Gaspar Fernandes, or Fernández (1566–1629)
 Alessandro Piccinini (1566–1638)
 Lucia Quinciani (born c. 1566; fl. 1611)
 Thomas Campion (1567–1620)
 Christoph Demantius (1567–1643)
 Jean-Baptiste Besard (1567–1625)
 Nicolas Formé (1567–1638)
 Girolamo Giacobbi (1567–1629)
 Joachim van den Hove (c. 1567–1620)
 René Mesangeau (fl. 1567–1638)
 Lorenzo Allegri (1567–1648)
 Claudio Monteverdi (1567–1643)
 Bartolomeo Barbarino (c. 1568–1617 or later)
 Philip Rosseter (1568–1623)
 Adriano Banchieri (1568–1634)
 Christian Erbach (c. 1568–1635)
 Joan Baptista Comes (1568–1643)
 Edward Gibbons (1568–1650)
 Richard Gibbs (1568–1650)
 Giovanni Francesco Anerio (1569–1630)
 Tobias Hume (1569–1645)
 Ottavio Vernizzi (1569–1649)
 Orazio Bassani, "Orazio della Viola" (before 1570–1615)
 Thomas Bateson (1570–1630)
 Benjamin Cosyn (1570–1652 or later)
 Giovanni Paolo Cima (c. 1570–1622)
 Peeter Cornet (c. 1570/1580–1633)
 Pierre Guédron (c. 1570–c. 1620)
 Paul Peuerl (1570–1625)
 Joan Pau Pujol (1570–1626)
 Salamone Rossi (c. 1570–1630)
 Girolamo Bartei (c. 1570–c. 1618)
 Claudia Sessa (c. 1570–c. 1617/1619)
 Giovanni Battista Fontana (c. 1571–c. 1630)
 Thomas Lupo (1571–1627)
 Filipe de Magalhães (c. 1571–1652)
 Giovanni Picchi (1571–1643)
 Michael Praetorius (c. 1571–1621)
 John Ward (1571–1638)
 Edward Johnson (1572–1601)
 Daniel Bacheler (1572–1619)
 Melchior Borchgrevinck (1572-1632)
 Martin Peerson (1572–1651)
 Thomas Tomkins (1572–1656)
 Moritz von Hessen-Kassel (1572–1632)
 Erasmus Widmann (1572–1634)
 Salvatore Sacco (1572–1622)
 Ellis Gibbons (1573–1603)
 Géry de Ghersem (1573/1575–1630)
 Cesarina Ricci de Tingoli (born c. 1573, fl. 1597)
 Claudio Pari (1574–after 1619)
 Francesco Rasi (1574–1621)
Gabriel Bataille (1574–1630)
 John Wilbye (1574–1638)
 Andreas Hakenberger (1574–1627)
 John Bennet (1575–after 1614)
 Vittoria Aleotti (c. 1575–after 1620)
 Abundio Antonelli (c. 1575?–c. 1629)
 Robert Ballard (c. 1575–1645)
 Estêvão de Brito (1575–1641)
 John Coprario, or John Cooper (c. 1575–1626)
 Ignazio Donati (c. 1575–1638)
 Daniel Farrant (c. 1575–1651)
 Alfonso Ferrabosco the younger (c. 1575–1628)
 Michelagnolo Galilei (1575–1631)
 Ennemond Gaultier, le Vieux Gaultier (1575–1651)
  (c. 1575–1627?)
 Léonard de Hodémont (c. 1575–1639)
 Esteban López Morago, or Estêvão Lopes Morago (c. 1575–after 1630)
 Giovanni Priuli (c. 1575–1626)
 Mateo Romero, or Mathieu Rosmarin (c. 1575–1647)
 William Simmes (c. 1575–c. 1625)
 Giovanni Maria Trabaci (c. 1575–1647)
 Thomas Weelkes (1576–1623)
 John Maynard (1577–between 1614 and 1633)
 Robert Jones (1577–1617)
 Stefano Bernardi (c. 1577–1637)
 Antonio Brunelli (1577–1630)
 Sulpitia Cesis (b. 1577; fl. 1619)
 Agostino Agazzari (1578–1640)
 John Amner (1579–1641)
 Melchior Franck (c. 1579–1639)
 Adriana Basile (c. 1580–c. 1640)
 Domenico Brunetti (c. 1580–1646)
 Andrea Cima, or Giovanni Andrea Cima (c. 1580–after 1627)
 Jacques Cordier (c. 1580–before 1655) 
 Richard Dering (c. 1580–1630)
 Michael East (1580–1648)
 Thomas Ford (c. 1580–1648)
 Johannes Hieronymus Kapsberger, or Giovanni Girolamo Kapsperger (c. 1580–1651)
 John Lugg (1580–1647/1655)
 Hans Nielsen (1580-1626)
 François Richard (1580–1650)
 Johann Stobäus (1580–1646)
 Vincenzo Ugolini (c. 1580–1638)
 Bellerofonte Castaldi (c. 1581–1649)
 Johannes Jeep (1581/1582–1644)
 Johann Staden (1581–1634)
 Gregorio Allegri (1582–1652)
 Severo Bonini (1582–1663)
 Marco da Gagliano (1582–1643)
 Sigismondo d'India (c. 1582–1629)
 Thomas Ravenscroft (c. 1582–c. 1635)
 Thomas Simpson (1582–1628)
 Giovanni Valentini (c. 1582–1649)
 Paolo Agostino, or Agostini (c. 1583–1629)
 Girolamo Frescobaldi (1583–1643)
 Orlando Gibbons (1583–1625)

 Robert Johnson (c. 1583–1634)
 Johann Daniel Mylius (1583–1642)
 Mogens Pedersøn (c. 1583–1623)
 Nicolas Vallet (c. 1583–c. 1642)
 Michael Altenburg (1584–1640)
 Antonio Cifra (1584–1629)
 Francisco Correa de Arauxo (1584–1654)
 Daniel Friderici (1584–1638)
  (c. 1584–1671)
 Domenico Allegri (1585–1629)
 Antoine Boësset, Sieur de Villedieu (1586–1643)
 Jean de Bournonville (1585–1632)
 Louis Constantin (c. 1585–1657)
 Nicolò Corradini (c. 1585–1646)
 Andrea Falconieri (1585–1656)
 Johann Grabbe (1585–1655)
 Peter Hasse (c. 1585–1640)
 Francesco Rognoni (1585–after 1626)
 Heinrich Schütz (1585–1672)
 Nicolas Signac (1585–1645)
 Alessandro Grandi (1586–1630)
 Lucio Barbieri (1586-1659)
 Stefano Landi (1586–1639)
 Jacob Praetorius (1586–1651)
 Claudio Saracini (1586–1630)
 Johann Hermann Schein (1586–1630)
 Paul Siefert (1586–1666)
 John Adson (c. 1587–1640)
 Francesca Caccini (1587–c. 1640)
 Ivan Lukačić (c. 1587–1648)
 Samuel Scheidt (1587–1654)
 Guillaume Bouzignac (1587–1643)
 Charles d'Ambleville (1588–1637)
 Walter Porter (1588–1659)
  (1588–1671)
 Johann Andreas Herbst (1588–1666)
 Nicholas Lanier (1588–1666)
 Marin Mersenne (1588–1648)
 John Tomkins (1589–1638)
 Guilielmus Messaus (1589–1640)
 Francesco Turini (1589–1656)
 Caterina Assandra (c. 1590–after 1618)
 Artus Aux-Cousteaux (c. 1590–1656)
 Giovanni Pietro Berti (c. 1590?–1638)
 Hans Brachrogge (c. 1590-c. 1638)
 Dario Castello (c. 1590–c. 1658)
 Giovanni Martino Cesare (c. 1590–1667)
 Andreas Chyliński, or Andrzej Chyliński (c. 1590–after 1635)
 Jacob van Eyck (c. 1590–1657)
 Juan Gutiérrez de Padilla (c. 1590–1664)
 Adam Jarzębski (c. 1590–c. 1648)
 Manuel Machado (c. 1590–1646)
 Carlo Milanuzzi (c. 1590–c. 1647)
 Johann Schop (c. 1590–1667)
 Johannes Thesselius (c. 1590?–1643)
 Lucrezia Orsina Vizzana (1590–1662)
 Robert Ramsey (1590s–1644)
 Richard Mico (1590–1661)
 Nicolò Borbone, or Borboni (c. 1591–1641)
 Settimia Caccini (1591–1638?)
 Robert Dowland (c. 1591–1641)
 Isaac Posch (1591?–c. 1623)
 Cornelis Padbrué (c. 1592–1670)
 Jacques Gaultier (1592–1652)
 Paul Auget (1592–1660)
 John Jenkins (1592–1678)
 Domenico Mazzocchi (1592–1665)
 Melchior Schildt (1592/1593–1667)
 Truid Aagesen (1593-1625)
 Claudia Rusca (1593–1676)
 Gottfried Scheidt (1593–1661)
 Johann Ulrich Steigleder (1593–1635)
 Nicolas Le Vasseur (1593–1658)
 Matthäus Apelles von Löwenstern (1594–1648)
 Francesco Manelli (1594–1667)
 Biagio Marini (1594–1663)
 Orazio Michi, "Orazio dell'Arpa" (c. 1594–1641)
 Tarquinio Merula (1594/1595–1665)
 Antonio Maria Abbatini (c. 1595–1680)
 Giovanni Battista Buonamente (c. 1595–1642)
 Henry Lawes (1595–1662)
 John Okeover, or Oker (c. 1595–1663)
 Bartolomé de Selma y Salaverde (c. 1595–after 1638)
 Heinrich Scheidemann (c. 1595–1663)
 John Wilson (1595–1674)
 Constantijn Huygens (1596–1687)
 Giovanni Rovetta (c. 1596–1668)
 Andreas Düben (1597–1662)
 Virgilio Mazzocchi (1597–1646)
 Charles Racquet (1597–1664)
 Luigi Rossi (c. 1597–1653)
 Johann Crüger (1598–1662)
 Giovanni Battista Fasolo (c. 1598–c. 1664)
 Pierre Gaultier d'Orleans (1599–1681)
 John Hilton the younger (c. 1599–1657)
 Étienne Moulinié (1599–1676)
 Thomas Selle (1599–1663)

 John Marchant (died 1611)
 Richard Martin (fl. c. 1610)
 Girolamo Dalla Casa (fl. from 1568; d. 1601)
 William Tisdale (born 1570)
 Henry Lichfild (died 1613)
 John Bartlet (fl. 1606–1610)
 Thomas Greaves (fl. 1604)
 Richard Sumarte (d. after 1630)
 Richard Nicholson (died 1639)
 Jean Boyer (15??–1648)
 Thomas Vautor (1580/1590–?)
 Henry Youll (1580/1590–?)
 George Handford (fl. c. 1609)
 Robert Tailour (fl. 1615)
 Charles Coleman (died 1646)
 William Corkine (fl. 1610–1617)
 Juan Arañés (fl. 1624–49; d. c. 1649)
 Giovanni Battista Grillo (died 1622)
 Marcantonio Negri (died 1624)
 Giovanni Battista Riccio (fl. 1609–1621)
 Giuseppe Scarani (fl. 1628–fl. 1642)
 Adam z Wągrowca (died 1629)
 Mikołaj Zieleński (fl. 1611)

Middle Baroque era composers (born 1600–49) 

Composers of the Middle Baroque era include the following figures listed by the date of their birth:

 Mlle Bocquet (early 17th century–after 1660)
 Alessandro Poglietti (early 17th century–1683)
 François de La Roche (?–1677)
 François de Chancy (?–1656)
 Henry Frémart (16..–1651)
 Jean Veillot (16..–1662)
 Pierre Méliton (16? – 1684)
 Antonio de Jesús (????–1682)
 Demachy ou le Sieur De Machy (16? – 1692)
 Manuel Correia (c. 1600–1653)
 Giuseppe Giamberti (c.1600 – c. 1663)
 Bonaventura Rubino (c. 1600–1668)
  (c. 1600–1675)
 Simon Ives (1600–1662)
 Nicolaus à Kempis (c. 1600–1676)
 Adam Václav Michna z Otradovic (c. 1600–1676)
 Marcin Mielczewski (c. 1600–1651)
 Carlos Patiño (1600–1675)
  (c. 1600–c. 1648)
 Giovanni Felice Sances (c. 1600–1679)
 Marco Scacchi (c. 1600–1662)
 Delphin Strungk (1600/1601–1694)
 Louis XIII (1601–1643)
 Michelangelo Rossi (c. 1601–1656)
 Jean-Baptiste Geoffroy (1601–1675)
 Jacques Champion de Chambonnières (1601/1602–1672)
 Francesco Cavalli (1602–1676)
 Chiara Margarita Cozzolani (1602–c. 1678)
 William Lawes (1602–1645)
 Marco Marazzoli (c. 1602–1662)
 Christopher Simpson (c. 1602/1606–1669)
  (1602–1677)
 Benedetto Ferrari (c. 1603?–1681)
 Francesco Foggia (1603–1688)
 Denis Gaultier, Gaultier le jeune (1603–1672)
 John IV of Portugal (1603–1656)
 Caspar Kittel (1603–1639)
 Natale Monferrato (c. 1603–1685)
 Diego Pontac (1603–1654)
 Marco Uccellini (1603/1610–1680)
 Heinrich Albert (1604–1651)
 François Dufault (1604–1670)
 Bonifazio Graziani (1604/1605–1664)
 Charles d'Assoucy (1605–1677)
 Orazio Benevoli (1605–1672)
 Antonio Bertali (1605–1669)
 Giacomo Carissimi (1605–1674)
 Francesco Sacrati (1605–1650)
 Johann Vierdanck (c. 1605–1646)
 Jean de Cambefort (1605–1661)
 Charles Coypeau d'Assoucy (1605–1677)
 William Child (1606–1697)
 Michel de La Guerre (c. 1606–1679)
  (1606–1677)
 Urbán de Vargas (1606–1656)
 Sigmund Theophil Staden (1607–1655)
 Abraham Megerle (1607–1680)
 Philipp Friedrich Böddecker (1607–1683)
 Ferdinand III, Holy Roman Emperor (1608–1657)
 Jacques de Gouy (c. 1610–after 1650)
 Valentin de Bournonville (1610–1663)
 François Cosset (1610-1664)
 Nicolas Hotman (c. 1610–1663)
 João Lourenço Rebelo (1610–1661)
 William Young (c. 1610–1662)
 Nicolas Métru (1610–1668)
 Sébastien Le Camus (c. 1610–1677)
 Leonora Duarte (1610–1678)
  (c. 1610–after 1682)
 Henri Du Mont (1610–1684)
 George Jeffreys (c. 1610–1685)
 Michel Lambert (1610–1696)
 Leonora Baroni (1611–1670)
 Thomas Brewer (1611–c. 1660)
 Pablo Bruna (1611–1679)
 Andreas Hammerschmidt (1611/1612–1675)
 Wolfgang Ebner (1612–1665)
 Jacques Huyn (1613–1652)
 Elisabeth Sophie, Duchess of Brunswick-Lüneburg (1613–1676)
 Thomas Mace (c. 1613–1709?)
 Louis de Mollier (c. 1613–1688)
 Giovanni Antonio Rigatti (c. 1613–1648)
 Wilhelm Karges (1613/1614–1699)
 Jean-Baptiste Boësset, Sieur de Dehault (1614–1685)
 Philipp Friedrich Buchner (1614–1669)
 Juan Hidalgo de Polanco (1614–1685)
 Marc'Antonio Pasqualini (1614–1691)
 Franz Tunder (1614–1667)
 Yatsuhashi Kengyo (1614–1685)
 Francesca Campana (c. 1615–1665)
 Heinrich Bach (1615–1692)
 Angelo Michele Bartolotti (c. 1615–1696)
 Guillaume Dumanoir (1615–1697)
 Francesco Corbetta (c. 1615–1681)
 Christopher Gibbons (1615–1676)
 Francisco López Capillas (c. 1615–1673)
 Maurizio Cazzati (1616–1678)
 Kaspar Förster (the younger) (1616–1673)
 Johann Jakob Froberger (1616–1667)
 Johann Erasmus Kindermann (1616–1655)
 Jacques de Saint-Luc (1616–c. 1710)
 Matthias Weckmann (c. 1616–1674)
 Carlo Caproli (c. 1617–c. 1692)
 Nikolaus Hasse (c. 1617–1672)
 Francisco Martins (c. 1617?–1680)
 Joan Cererols (1618–1680)
 Abraham van den Kerckhoven (c. 1618–c. 1701)
 José Marín (1618–1699)
 Pierre Robert (c. 1618 – 1699)
  (1619–1701)
 Anthoni van Noordt (c. 1619–1675)
 Johann Rosenmüller (1619–1684)
 Barbara Strozzi (1619–1677)
 Juan García de Zéspedes (c. 1619–1678)
 Joannes Baptista Dolar, also Janez Krstnik Dolar or Jan Křtitel Tolar (c. 1620–1673)
 Adam Drese (c. 1620–1701)
 Isabella Leonarda (1620–1704)
 Johann Heinrich Schmelzer (c. 1620–1680)
 Giovanni Battista Granata (1620/1621–1687)
 Georg Arnold (1621–1676)
 Albertus Bryne (1621–1668)
 Massimiliano Neri (composer) (1621–1666)
 Matthew Locke (c. 1621–1677)
 Georg Neumark (1621–1681)
 Bertrand de Bacilly (1621–1690)
 Heinrich Schwemmer (1621–1696)
 Ercole Bernabei (1622–1687)
 Jean Lacquemant, known as DuBuisson (c. 1622–1680)
 Gaspar de Verlit (1622–1682)
 Dietrich Becker (c. 1623–c. 1679)
 Antonio Cesti (1623–1669)
 Jacopo Melani (1623–1676)
 David Pohle (1624–1695)
 Francesco Provenzale (1624–1704)
 François Roberday (1624–1680)
 Johann Rudolf Ahle (1625–1673)
 Alexandre Gallot (1625–1684)
 Jacques Gallot, le vieux Gallot de Paris (c. 1625–1695)
 Marco Giuseppe Peranda (c. 1625–1675)
 Wolfgang Carl Briegel (1626–1712)
 Louis Couperin (c. 1626–1661)
 Christian Flor (1626–1697)
 Giovanni Legrenzi (1626–1690)
 Charles Mouton (1626–1710)
 Lucas Ruiz de Ribayaz (1626–1667?)
 Nicolas Gigault (c. 1627–1707)
 Johann Caspar Kerll (1627–1693)
 Christoph Bernhard (1628–1692)
 Robert Cambert (c. 1628–1677)
 Samuel Capricornus (1628–1665)
 Constantin Christian Dedekind (1628–1715)
 Gustaf Düben (1628–1690)
  (1628–1686)
 Jean-Henri d'Anglebert (1629–1691)
 Lelio Colista (1629–1680)
 Lady Mary Dering (1629–1704)
 Andreas Hofer (1629–1684)
  (1629–1685)
 John Banister (c. 1630–1679) 
 Cristóbal Galán (c. 1630–1684)
 Filipe da Madre de Deus (c. 1630–c. 1688 or later)
 Carlo Pallavicino (c. 1630–1688)
 Giovanni Antonio Pandolfi Mealli (c. 1630?–1669/1670)
 Antonio Sartorio (1630–1680)
 Vincenzo Albrici (1631–1696)
 Thomas Baltzar (c. 1631–1663)
 Nicolas Lebègue (1631–1702)
 Sebastian Anton Scherer (1631–1712)
 Francesco Antonio Urio (1631/1632–c. 1719)
 Jean-Baptiste Lully (1632–1687)
 Guillaume-Gabriel Nivers (1632–1714)
 Giovanni Battista Vitali (1632–1692)
 Jean-Nicolas Geoffroy (1633–1694)
 Sebastian Knüpfer (1633–1676)
 Joseph Chabanceau de La Barre (1633–1678)
 Pavel Josef Vejvanovský (c. 1633/1639–1693)
 Innocent Boutry (1634-1690/95)
 Clamor Heinrich Abel (1634–1696)
 Antonio Draghi (c. 1634–1700)
 Carlo Grossi (c. 1634–1688)
 Adam Krieger (1634–1666)
  (1634–1696)
  (c. 1635–1680)
 Lambert Chaumont (c. 1635–1712)
 Jacques Thomelin (1635/40–1693)
 Daniel Danielis (1635–1696)
 Johann Wilhelm Furchheim (c. 1635–1682)
 Miguel de Irízar (1635–1684)
 Joannes Florentius a Kempis (1635–after 1711)
 Paul I, Prince Esterházy of Galántha (1635–1713)
 Augustin Pfleger (1635–1686)
 Jacek Różycki (c. 1635–1704)
 Angelo Berardi (c. 1636–1694)
 Giovanni Battista degli Antonii, or degli Antoni (c. 1636?–after 1696)
 Esaias Reusner (1636–1679)
 Dieterich Buxtehude (c. 1637–1707)
 Giovanni Paolo Colonna (1637–1695)
 Johann Georg Ebeling (1637–1676)
 Louis-Nicolas Le Prince (1637–1693)
 Louis Chein (1637–1694)
 Giovanni Maria Pagliardi (1637–1702)
 Bernardo Pasquini (1637–1710)
 Diogo Dias Melgás (1638–1700)
 Giovanni Buonaventura Viviani (1638–c. 1693)
 Pietro degli Antonii (1639–1720)
  (1639–1709)
 Alessandro Melani (1639–1703)
 Johann Christoph Pezel (1639–1694)
 Juan García de Salazar (1639–1710)
 André Raison (1640s–1719)
 Amalia Catharina, Countess of Erbach (1640–1697)
 Antonia Bembo (c. 1640–1720)
 Cristoforo Caresana (c. 1640–1709)
 Giovanni Battista Draghi (c. 1640–1708)
 Carolus Hacquart (c. 1640–1701?)
 Leopold I, Holy Roman Emperor (1640–1705)
 Paolo Lorenzani (1640–1713)
  (1640–1725)
 Monsieur de Sainte-Colombe, the father (c. 1640–c. 1700)
 Gaspar Sanz (1640–1710)
 Nicolaus Adam Strungk (1640–1700)
 Esther Elizabeth Velkiers (c. 1640–after 1685)
 Maria Francesca Nascinbeni (1640–1680)
 Francesco Beretta (c. 1640 – 1694)
 Wolfgang Caspar Printz (1641–1717)
 Pierre Gaultier, dit Gaultier of Marseille (1642–1696)
 Johann Friedrich Alberti (1642–1710)
 Georg Christoph Bach (1642–1697)
 Johann Christoph Bach (1642–1703)
 Giovanni Maria Bononcini (1642–1678)
 Benedictus Buns, or Benedictus a Sancto Josepho (1642–1716)
 Michelangelo Falvetti (1642–1692)
 Pierre-Richard Menault (1642–1694)
 Friedrich Funcke (1642–1699)
 Marc-Antoine Charpentier (1643–1704)
 Johann Adam Reincken (1643?–1722)
 Alessandro Stradella (1643–1682)
 Ignazio Albertini (1644–1685)
 Heinrich Ignaz Franz von Biber (1644–1704)
 Juan Bautista Cabanilles (1644–1712)
 Maria Cattarina Calegari (1644–1675)
 Johann Samuel Drese (c. 1644–1716)
 Johann Wolfgang Franck (1644–1710)
 Tomás de Torrejón y Velasco (1644–1728)
 Johann Georg Conradi (1645–1699)
 August Kühnel (1645–c. 1700)
  (1645–1705)
 Carlo Ambrogio Lonati (c. 1645–1710)
 Pierre Tabart (1645–1717)
 Christian Ritter (c. 1645–c. 1725)
 Andreas Werckmeister (1645–1706)
 Juan de Araujo (1646–1712)
 Johann Fischer (1646–1716)
 Rupert Ignaz Mayr (1646–1712)
 René Pignon Descoteaux (c. 1646–1728)
 Johann Theile (1646–1724)
 Pelham Humfrey (1647–1674)
  (1647–1702)
 Michael Wise (c. 1647–1687)
 Pierre Danican Philidor (1647–1730)
 Johann Michael Bach (1648–1694)
 Johann Melchior Caesar (c. 1648–1692) (de:s)
  (1648–1726)
 David Funck (1648?–after 1690) ([])
 Johann Schelle (1648–1701)
 Poul Christian Schindler (1648–1740)
  (1649–1732)
 John Blow (1649–1708)
 Jacques Boyvin (1649–1706)
 Pieter Bustijn (c. 1649–1729)
 Pascal Collasse (1649–1709)
  (1649–1726)
 Francesc Guerau (1649–1717/1722)
 Andreas Kneller (1649–1724)
 Johann Philipp Krieger (1649–1725)
 Johann Valentin Meder (1649–1719)
 François-Joseph Salomon (1649–1732)

 

 Pedro de Araújo (fl. 1662–1705)
 Alba Trissina (born 1622)
 Bartholomäus Aich (fl. 1648)
  (fl. 1641–1644; d. 1657)
 John Gamble (fl. from 1641, died 1687)
 Gervise Gerrard (16??–16??)
 Bernardo Gianoncelli (fl. early 17th century; d. before 1650)
 Louis Grabu (fl. 1665–1693)
 Nicola Matteis (fl. c. 1670–1698; d. after 1713)
 , or Morhard (fl. from 1662; d. 1685)
 Bartłomiej Pękiel (died c. 1670)
 Bernardo Sabadini (fl. from 1662; d. 1718)
 Louis Saladin (fl. c. 1670)
 Bernardo Storace (fl. 1664)
 August Verdufen, or Werduwen (17th century)

Late Baroque era composers (born 1650–99) 

Composers of the Late Baroque era include the following figures listed by the date of their birth:

 Cataldo Amodei (c. 1650–c. 1695)
 Giovanni Battista Bassani (c. 1650–1716)
 Giovanni Battista Brevi (c. 1650–1725)
 Christian Geist (c. 1650–1711)
 Johann Anton Losy von Losinthal, or Comte d'Logy (c. 1650–1721)
 Guillaume Minoret (c. 1650–1717/1720)
 Juan Francisco de Navas (c. 1650–1719)
 Antonio de Salazar (c. 1650–1715)
 Stanisław Sylwester Szarzyński (c. 1650–c. 1720)
 Theobaldo di Gatti (1650–1727)
 Pietro Torri (1650–1737)
 Robert de Visée (c. 1650–1732/1733)
 Johann Jacob Walther (1650–1717)
 Johann Georg Ahle (1651–1706)
 Petronio Franceschini (1651–1680)
 Domenico Gabrielli (1651/1659–1690)
 Gilles Jullien (c. 1651/1653–1703)
 Johann Krieger (1651–1735)
 Jean-François Lalouette (1651–1728)
 David Petersen (c. 1651–1737)
 Ferdinand Tobias Richter (1651–1711)
 William Turner (1651–1740)
 Johann Philipp Förtsch (1652–1732)
  (1652–1706)
 John Abell (1653–after 1724)
 Arcangelo Corelli (1653–1713)
 Georg Muffat (1653–1704)
 Johann Pachelbel (1653–1706), German composer, organist and teacher
 Carlo Francesco Pollarolo (c. 1653–1723)
 Johann Christoph Rothe (1653–1700)
 Agostino Steffani (1653–1728)
 Marc'Antonio Ziani (c. 1653–1715)
 Pietro Antonio Fiocco (1654–1714)
 Servaes de Koninck (c. 1654–c. 1701)
 Christian Liebe (1654–1708)
 Vincent Lübeck (1654–1740)
 Pablo Nassarre (c. 1654–c. 1730)
 Ludovico Roncalli (1654–1713)
 Pierre Bouteiller (1655–1717)
 Sébastien de Brossard (1655–1730)
 Ruggiero Fedeli (c. 1655–1722)
 Juan Serqueira de Lima (c. 1655–c. 1726)
 Johann Caspar Ferdinand Fischer (1656–1746)
 Marin Marais (1656–1728)
 Jean-Baptiste Moreau (1656–1733)
 James Paisible, or Jacques Paisible (c. 1656–1721)
 Georg Reutter (1656–1738)
 Thomas Tudway (c. 1656–1726)
 Matías Juan de Veana (c. 1656–after 1708)
 Johann Paul von Westhoff (1656–1705)
 Philipp Heinrich Erlebach (1657–1714)
 Michel-Richard de Lalande, or Delalande (1657–1726)
 Gaetano Greco (c. 1657–c. 1728)
 Giuseppe Ottavio Pitoni (1657–1743)
 Damian Stachowicz (1658–1699)
 Giuseppe Torelli (1658–1709)
 Sybrandus van Noordt (1659–1705)
 Henry Purcell (1659–1695)
 Francesco Antonio Pistocchi (1659–1726)
 Theodor Schwartzkopff (1659–1732)
 Antonio Veracini (1659–1745)
 Sainte-Colombe, the son (1660–1720)
 Henrico Albicastro, or Johann Heinrich von Weissenburg (c. 1660–after 1730)
 Rosa Giacinta Badalla (c. 1660–c. 1710)
 Francesco Ballaroti (c. 1660–1712)
  (c. 1660–1732)
 André Campra (1660–1744)
 Jerónimo de Carrión (1660–1721)
 Sebastián Durón (1660–1716)
 Gottfried Finger (1660–1730)
 Johann Joseph Fux (1660–1741)
 Friedrich Gottlieb Klingenberg (c. 1660?–1720)
 Johann Kuhnau (1660–1722)
 Johann Sigismund Kusser (1660–1727)
 Gaspard Le Roux (c. 1660–1707)
 Jacques-François Lochon (c. 1660–c. 1710)
 Monsieur de Sainte-Colombe le fils (the younger) (c. 1660–c. 1720)
 Alessandro Scarlatti (1660–1725)
 Johannes Schenck (1660–c. 1712)
 Christian Friedrich Witt (c. 1660–1717)
 Georg Böhm (1661–1733)
 Henri Desmarest (1661–1741)
 Francesco Gasparini (1661–1727)
 Giacomo Antonio Perti (1661–1756)
 Giovanni Lorenzo Lulier (c. 1662?–1700)
 Angiola Teresa Moratori Scanabecchi (1662–1708)
 Jean-Baptiste Drouard de Bousset (1662–1725)
 Pirro Capacelli Albergati (1663–1735)
 Johann Nikolaus Hanff (1663–1711)
 Franz Xaver Murschhauser (1663–1738)
 Jean-Baptiste Matho (1663–1743)
 Nicolas Siret (1663–1754)
 Tomaso Antonio Vitali (1663–1745)
 Friedrich Wilhelm Zachau, or Zachow (1663–1712)
 Jean Mignon (1664–1694)
 Nicolas Bernier (1664–1734)
 Georg Dietrich Leyding, or Leiding (1664–1710)
 Pierre Dandrieu (1664–1733)
 Louis Lully (1664–1734)
 Michele Mascitti (c. 1664–1760)
 Georg Österreich (1664–1735)
 Johann Christoph Pez (1664–1716)
 Daniel Purcell (1664–1717)
 Johann Speth (1664–after 1719)
 Filippo Amadei, "Pippo del Violoncello" (c. 1665–c. 1725)
 Benedikt Anton Aufschnaiter (1665–1742)
 Nicolaus Bruhns (1665–1697)
 Grzegorz Gerwazy Gorczycki (c. 1665/1667–1734)
 Élisabeth Jacquet de La Guerre (1665–1729)
 Joseph Valette de Montigny (1665–1738)
 Jean-Baptiste Lully fils (the younger) (1665–1743)
 Giovanni Maria Ruggieri (c. 1665–c. 1725)
 José de Torres y Martínez Bravo (1665–1738)
 Francisco Valls (1665–1747)
 Gaetano Veneziano (1665–1716)
 Domenico Zanatta (c. 1665–1748)
 Jean-Conrad Baustetter (1666–1722)
 Attilio Ariosti (1666–1729)
 Johann Heinrich Buttstett (1666–1727)
  (1666–1727)
 Michelangelo Faggioli (1666–1733)
 Jean-Féry Rebel (1666–1747)
 Francesco Scarlatti (1666–c. 1741)
 Bernardo Tonini (c. 1666–after 1727)
 Georg Bronner (1667–1720)
 Antonio Lotti (c. 1667–1740)
 Jean-Louis Lully (1667–1688)
 Michel Pignolet de Montéclair (1667–1737)
 Johann Christoph Pepusch (1667–1752)
 François Couperin (1668–1733)
 John Eccles (1668–1735)
 Jean Gilles (1668–1705)
  (c. 1668–after 1731)
 Georg von Bertouch (1668–1743)
 Jean-Baptiste Gouffet (1669–1729)
 Johann Nicolaus Bach (1669–1753)
 Louis Marchand (1669–1732)
 Alessandro Marcello (1669–1747)
 Andreas Armsdorff (1670–1699)
 Giuseppe Avitrano (c. 1670–1756)
 Giovanni Bononcini (1670–1747)
  (1670–1727)
 Christian Ludwig Boxberg (1670–1729)
 Arnold Brunckhorst (1670–1725)
 Louis de Caix d'Hervelois (c. 1670–c. 1760)
 Antonio Caldara (1670–1736)
 Turlough O'Carolan (1670–1738)
 Charles Dieupart (c. 1670–c. 1740)
 Henry Eccles (1670–1742)
 David Kellner (1670–1748)
 Richard Leveridge (1670–1758)
  (c. 1670–1719)
 Jean-Baptiste Volumier, or Woulmyer (1670–1728)
 Johann Hugo von Wilderer (1670/1671–1724)
 Tomaso Giovanni Albinoni (1671–1751)
 Giuseppe Aldrovandini (1671–1707)
 Johann Christoph Bach (1671–1721)
 Azzolino della Ciaja, or della Ciaia (1671–1755)
 Gaspard Corrette (c. 1671–before 1733)
 Charles-Hubert Gervais (1671–1744)
 Teodorico Pedrini (1671–1746)
 François Estienne (1671–1755)
 Louis-Nicolas Blondel (?–1671)
 Robert Valentine, also known as Roberto Valentino (c. 1671–1747)
 Carlo Agostino Badia (1672–1738)
 Francesco Antonio Bonporti (1672–1749)
 André Cardinal Destouches (1672–1749)
 Nicolas de Grigny (1672–1703)
 François Duval (1672–1728)
 Francesco Mancini (1672–1737)
 Antoine Forqueray (1672–1745)
 Georg Caspar Schürmann (1672/1673–1751)
 Petrus Hercules Brehy, or Pierre-Hercule Bréhy (1673–1737)
 Antonio de Literes (1673–1747)
 Santiago de Murcia (1673–1739)
 Jeremiah Clarke (c. 1674–1707)
 Reinhard Keiser (1674–1739)
 Pierre Dumage (c. 1674–1751)
 Jacques-Martin Hotteterre, called Le Romain (1674–1763)
 Evaristo Felice Dall'Abaco (1675–1742)
 Michel de la Barre (c. 1675–1745)
 Louis de La Coste, or Lacoste (c. 1675–c. 1750)
  (1675–1719)
 Jacques de Bournonville (1675–175?)
 Giovanni Porta (c. 1675–1755)
 Obadiah Shuttleworth (c. 1675?–1734)
 Francesco Venturini (c. 1675–1745)
 Johann Bernhard Bach (1676–1749)
 Diogenio Bigaglia (1676–1745)
 Louis-Nicolas Clérambault (1676–1749)
 Thomas-Louis Bourgeois (1676–1750)
 Giacomo Facco (1676–1753)
 Nicolas Racot de Grandval (1676–1753)
 Wolff Jakob Lauffensteiner (1676–1754)
 Giuseppe Maria Orlandini (1676–1760)
 John Weldon (1676–1736)
 Jean-Baptiste Anet (1676–1755)
 Johann Ludwig Bach (1677–1731)
 Antonio Maria Bononcini (1677–1726)
 Giovanni Carlo Maria Clari (1677–1754)
 Johann Wilhelm Drese (1677–1745)
 Francesco Nicola Fago (1677–1745)
 Jean-Baptiste Morin (1677–1745)
 Alexandre Villeneuve (1677–1758)
 Christian Petzold (1677–1733)
 Bonaventure Gilles (1678?–1758)
 William Croft (1678–1727)
 Ferdinando Antonio Lazzari (1678–1754)
 , or Jean-Antoine Desplanes (1678–1760)
 Antonio Vivaldi (1678–1741), Italian composer, violinist, teacher and cleric
 Manuel de Zumaya (c. 1678–1755)
 Georg Friedrich Kauffmann (1679–1735)
 Domenico Sarro (1679–1744)
 Pietro Filippo Scarlatti (1679–1750)
 Johann Christian Schieferdecker (1679–1732)
 Jan Dismas Zelenka (1679–1745)
 Françoise-Charlotte de Senneterre Ménétou (1679–1745)
 Toussaint Bertin de la Doué (c. 1680–1743)
 William Corbett (1680–1748)
 Giuseppe Fedeli, or Joseph Saggione (c. 1680–c. 1745)
 Jean-Adam Guilain (c. 1680–after 1739)
 Jean-Baptiste Loeillet of London (1680–1730)
 Giovanni Mossi (c. 1680?–1742)
  (c. 1680–c. 1740)
 Jean-Baptiste Stuck (1680–1755)
 Richard Jones (1680–1744)
 Emanuele d'Astorga (1681–1736)
 Carl Heinrich Biber (1681–1749)
 Francesco Bartolomeo Conti (1681–1732)
 Johann Mattheson (1681–1764)
 Anne Danican Philidor (1681–1728)
 Pierre Danican Philidor (1681–1731)
 Giovanni Reali (c. 1681–after 1727)
 Georg Philipp Telemann (1681–1767)
 Giuseppe Valentini (1681–1753)
 Paolo Benedetto Bellinzani (1682–1757)
 Giacobbe Cervetto (c. 1682–1783)
 Jean-François Dandrieu (c. 1682–1738)
 Jean-Joseph Mouret (1682–1738)
 Valentin Rathgeber (1682–1750)
 Pietro Baldassare (c. 1683–after 1768)
 Roque Ceruti (c. 1683–1760)
 Christoph Graupner (1683–1760)
 Johann David Heinichen (1683–1729)
 Jean-Philippe Rameau (1683–1764)
  (1683–1742)
 François d'Agincourt (1684–1758)
 François Bouvard (c. 1684–1760)
 Bohuslav Matěj Černohorský (1684–1742)
 Francesco Durante (1684–1755)
 Francesco Manfredini (1684–1762)
  (1684–1712)
 Johann Theodor Roemhildt (1684–1756)
 Johann Gottfried Walther (1684–1748)

 Giuseppe Matteo Alberti (1685–1751)
 Johann Sebastian Bach (1685–1750), German composer and organist
 Louis-Antoine Dornel (c. 1685–1765)
 Lodovico Giustini (1685–1743)
 Henri-Guillaume Hamal (1685–1752)
 George Frideric Handel (1685–1759)
 Václav Gunther Jacob (1685–1734)
 Jacques Loeillet (1685–1748)
 Roland Marais (c. 1685–c. 1750)
 Wilhelm Hieronymus Pachelbel (c. 1685–1764)
 Domenico Scarlatti (1685–1757)
 Pietro Giuseppe Gaetano Boni (c. 1686–after 1741)
 Jean-Joseph Fiocco (1686–1746)
 François Campion (1686–1747)
 Benedetto Marcello (1686–1739)
 Nicola Porpora (1686–1768)
 Giovanni Battista Somis (1686–1763)
 Jean-Baptiste Semaillé (1687–1730)
 Johann Adam Birkenstock (1687–1733)
 Henry Carey (1687–1743)
 Willem de Fesch (1687–1761)
 Johann Ernst Galliard (1687–1749)
 Francesco Geminiani (1687–1762)
 Johann Georg Pisendel (1687–1755)
 Jean Baptiste Senaillé (1687–1730)
 Jean-Baptiste-Maurice Quinault (1687–1745)
 Sylvius Leopold Weiss (1687–1750)
 Michele Falco (c. 1688–after 1732)
 Johann Friedrich Fasch (1688–1758)
 Jacob Klein (1688–1748)
 Jean-Baptiste Loeillet de Ghent (1688–1720)
 Joseph Michel (1688–1736)
 Thomas Roseingrave (1688–1766)
 Domenico Zipoli (1688–1726)
 Jacques Aubert (1689–1753)
 Jean-Baptiste Cappus (1689–1751)
 William Babell (c. 1689–1723)
 Joseph Bodin de Boismortier (1689–1755)
 Jan Josef Ignác Brentner (1689–1742)
 Charles Levens (1689–1764)
 Pietro Gnocchi (1689–1775)
 Jean-Baptiste Quentin (before 1690–c. 1742) (not to be confused with his son 1718–c. 1750)
 Francesco Barsanti (1690–1775)
  (c. 1690?–c. 1740)
 Giuseppe Antonio Brescianello (c. 1690 – 1758)
 Fortunato Chelleri (1690–1757)
 François Colin de Blamont (1690–1760)
 Giovanni Antonio Giai, or Giay, Giaj (1690–1764)
 Johann Tobias Krebs (1690–1762)
 Gottlieb Muffat (1690–1770)
 Jacques-Christophe Naudot (c. 1690–1762)
 Charles Theodore Pachelbel (1690–1750)
 Manuel José de Quirós (c. 1690?–1765)
 Gottfried Heinrich Stölzel (1690–1749)
 Carlo Tessarini (1690–1766)
 Francesco Maria Veracini (1690–1768)
 Leonardo Vinci (c. 1690–1730)
 Jean-Baptiste Niel (Nieil or Nielle) (1690–1775)
 Robert Woodcock (c. 1690 – 1728)
 Francesco Feo (1691–1761)
 Jan Francisci (1691–1758)
 Conrad Friedrich Hurlebusch (1691–1765)
 Louis Homet (1691–1767)
 Martin Berteau (1691-1771)
 Geminiano Giacomelli or Jacomelli (1692–1740)
 Antonio Palella (1692–1761)
 Giovanni Alberto Ristori (1692–1753)
 Giuseppe Tartini (1692–1770)
 Unico Wilhelm van Wassenaer (1692–1766)
 Louis Lemaire (1693?–1750?)
 Laurent Belissen (1693–1762)
 Šimon Brixi (1693–1735)
 Pierre-Gabriel Buffardin (1693–1768)
 Christoph Förster (1693–1745)
 Gregor Joseph Werner (1693–1766)
 Louis-Claude Daquin (1694–1772)
  (1694–1762)
 Pierre-Claude Foucquet (1694–1772)
 Leonardo Leo (1694–1744)
 Antonín Reichenauer (c. 1694–1730)
 Johan Helmich Roman (1694–1758)
 Luigi Merci (c.1695–1750)
 Johann Lorenz Bach (1695–1773)
 Pietro Locatelli (1695–1764)
 Marie-Anne-Catherine Quinault (1695–1791)
 Giuseppe Sammartini (1695–1750)
 Ernst Gottlieb Baron (1696–1760)
 Pierre Février (1696–1760)
 Jean-Philippe Borbollono (1696–?)
 Maurice Greene (1696–1755)
 Johann Melchior Molter (1696–1765)
 Johann Caspar Vogler (1696–1763)
 Andrea Zani (1696–1757)
 Esprit-Antoine Blanchard (1696–1770)
 Josse Boutmy (1697–1779)
 Cornelius Heinrich Dretzel (1697–1775)
 Louis-Maurice de La Pierre (1697–1753)
 Adam Falckenhagen (1697–1754)
 Johann Christian Hertel (1697/1699–1754)
 Jean-Marie Leclair l'aîné (1697–1764)
 Giuseppe de Majo (1697–1771)
 Giovanni Benedetto Platti (1697–1763)
 Johann Pfeiffer (1697–1761)
 Johann Joachim Quantz (1697–1773)
 Francesco Antonio Vallotti (1697–1780)
 Pietro Auletta (c. 1698–1771)
 Antonio Bioni (1698–1739)
 Henry Madin (1698–1748)
 Riccardo Broschi (c. 1698–1756)
 François Francoeur (1698–1787)
 František Jiránek (1698–1778)
 Nicola Bonifacio Logroscino (1698–c. 1764)
  (1698–1754)
 Jean-Baptiste Forqueray le fils (1699–1782)
 Joseph Gibbs (1699–1788)
 Johann Adolph Hasse (1699–1783)
 Juan Francés de Iribarren (1699–1767)
 Jan Zach (1699–1773)

Jean-Baptiste Dutartre (16..-1749) 
 Ignazio Pollice or Pulici (fl. 1684–1705)
 John Baston (fl. 1708–1739)
  (fl. 1733–1758)
 Domenico Della Bella (fl. c. 1700–1715)
 Michielina Della Pietà (fl. c. 1701–1744)
 Charles Dollé (fl. 1735–1755; d. after 1755)
 Giovanni Giorgi (fl. from 1719; d. 1762)
 Caterina Benedicta Grazianini (born 17th century; fl. from 1705)
 Maria Margherita Grimani (b. before 1700; fl. 1713–1718)
 Benoit Guillemant (fl. 1746–1757)
 Gottfried Lindemann (fl. 1713–1741; d. 1741)
 Le Sieur de Machy (d. after 1692)
 Jacques Morel (fl. c. 1700–1749)
 Antonio Orefice (fl. 1708–1734)
 Mrs Philarmonica (fl. 1715)
 Julie Pinel (fl. 1710–1737)
 Marieta Morosina Priuli (fl. 1665)
 Camilla de Rossi (fl. 1707–1710)
 Giovanni Zamboni (later 17th century–after 1718)

Early Galante era composers – transition from Baroque to Classical (born 1700 and after) 

Composers during the transition from the Baroque to Classical eras, sometimes seen as the beginning of the Galante era, include the following figures listed by their date of birth:

 Romano Antonio Piacentino (c. 18th century) 
 Louis-Joseph Marchand (17??-1743)
 Philibert Delavigne (c. 1700–1750)
 Francesco Biscogli (after 1700–after 1750)
 Mlle Guédon de Presles (early 18th century–1754)
 Johann Bernhard Bach (the younger) (1700–1743)
 João Rodrigues Esteves (1700–1751)
 François-Lupien Grenet (1700-1753)
 Jean-Baptiste Masse (c. 1700–c. 1757)
 Sebastian Bodinus (c. 1700–1759)
 Louis-Antoine Lefèbvre (1700-1763)
 Domenico Dall'Oglio (c. 1700–1764)
 Nicola Fiorenza (after 1700–1764)
 Michel Blavet (1700–1768)
 Christophe Moyreau (1700-1774)
 Giovanni Battista Sammartini (1700–1775)
 Johan Agrell (1701–1765)
 François Rebel (1701–1775)
 Jean-Pierre Guignon (1702-1774)
 Alessandro Besozzi (1702–1775)
 Johann Ernst Eberlin (1702–1762)
 José de Nebra (1702–1768)
 Francisco António de Almeida (c. 1702–1755)
 Joseph-Hector Fiocco (1703–1741)
 René Drouard de Bousset (1703-1760)
 John Frederick Lampe (1703–1751)
 Johann Gottlieb Graun (1703–1771)
 Jean-Marie Leclair le cadet (the younger) (1703–1777)
 Carlo Zuccari (1703–1792)
 Carlos Seixas (1704–1742)
 Rosanna Scalfi Marcello (1704 or 1705–after 1742)
 Carl Heinrich Graun (1704–1759)
 Giovanni Battista Pescetti (c. 1704–c. 1766)
 František Tůma (1704–1774)
 Philippe Courbois (1705-1730)
 Nicolas Chédeville (1705–1782)
 Henri-Jacques de Croes (1705–1786)
 Michael Christian Festing (1705–1752)
 Louis-Gabriel Guillemain (1705–1770)
 Johann Peter Kellner (1705–1772)
 Peter Prelleur (c. 1705?–1741)
 Pancrace Royer (1705–1755)
 Andrea Bernasconi (c. 1706–1784)
 Carlo Cecere (1706–1761)
 Baldassare Galuppi (1706–1785)
 Johann Gottfried Donati (1706-1782)
 William Hayes (1706–1777)
 Giovanni Battista Martini, or Padre Martini (1706–1784)
 Jean Barrière (1707–1747)
 Thomas Chilcot (c. 1707–1766)
 Michel Corrette (1707–1795)
 Ignacio de Jerusalem (c. 1707–1769)
 Johann Baptist Georg Neruda (c. 1707–c. 1780)
 Domenico Paradies or Pietro Domenico Paradisi (1707–1791)
 António Teixeira (1707–1769)
 Felix Benda (1708–1768)
 Egidio Duni (1708–1775)
 Johann Gottlieb Janitsch (1708–1763)
 Václav Jan Kopřiva, known as Urtica (1708–1789)
 Georg Reutter (the younger) (1708–1772)
 Johann Adolph Scheibe (1708–1776)
 Francesco Araja (1709–after 1762)
 Franz Benda (1709–1786)
 Princess Wilhelmine of Prussia (1709–1758)
 Christoph Schaffrath (1709–1763)
 Charles Avison (1709–1770)
 Domenico Alberti (c. 1710–1740)
 André-Joseph Exaudet (1710-1762)
 Joseph Abaco, or dall'Abaco (1710–1805)
 Thomas Arne (1710–1778)
 Wilhelm Friedemann Bach (1710–1784)
 Élisabeth de Haulteterre (fl. 1737–1768)
 Salvatore Lanzetti (1710–1780)
 Giovanni Battista Pergolesi (1710–1736)
 William Boyce (1711–1779)
 Ignaz Holzbauer (1711–1783)
 Gaetano Latilla (1711–1788)
 Davide Perez (1711–1778)
 Chadwille Wagon (1711-1799)
 Barbara of Portugal (1711–1758)
 Charles-Henri de Blainville (1711-1769)
 Jean-Joseph Cassanéa de Mondonville (1711–1772)
 James Oswald (1711–1769)
 Frederick the Great (1712–1786)
 John Hebden (1712–1765)
 Giacomo Puccini senior (1712-1781)
 Jean-Jacques Rousseau (1712–1778)
 John Christopher Smith (1712–1795)
 John Stanley (1712–1786)
 Antoine Dauvergne (1713–1797)
 Johan Henrik Freithoff (1713–1767)
 Johann Ludwig Krebs (1713–1780)
 Johann Nicolaus Mempel (1713–1747)
 Carl Philipp Emanuel Bach (1714–1788)
 John Alcock (1715–1806)
 Jacques Duphly (1715–1789)
 Josef Seger (1716–1782)
 Princess Philippine Charlotte of Prussia (1716–1801)
 Johann Wenzel Anton Stamitz (1717–1757)
 Richard Mudge (1718–1763)
 Abraham Caceres (1718–1740)
 Leopold Mozart (1719-1787)
 Joan Baptista Pla i Agustí  (c. 1720–1773)
 Pieter Hellendaal (1721–1799)
 Matthias Vanden Gheyn (1721–1785)
 Anna Amalia, Abbess of Quedlinburg (1723–1787)
 Rafael Antonio Castellanos (c. 1725–1791)
 Karl Kohaut (1726–1784)
 Henri Moreau (1728–1803)
 Pierre van Maldere (1729–1768)
 Antonio Soler (1729–1783)
 Capel Bond (1730–1790) 
 Gabriele Leone (c. 1735-1790)
 Simon Simon (1735?-1787?)
 José Joaquim dos Santos (1747?–1801)
 Alexander Maasmann (fl. 1713)
 Santa della Pietà (fl. c. 1725–1750, d. after 1774)

Brief timeline

See also
Baroque music
List of classical music composers by era
List of composers by name
Women in Music

There is considerable overlap near the beginning and end of this era. See lists of composers for the previous and following eras:
List of Renaissance composers
List of Classical era composers

Baroque
 List